Miguel Saiz (May 17, 1949 – October 22, 2019) was an Argentine politician latterly of the Radical Civic Union (UCR), who served as governor of Río Negro Province from 2003 until 2011.

Born in Montevideo, Uruguay, Saiz studied at the National University of Córdoba and became a lawyer. He became affiliated with the centrist UCR in 1983, and subsequently directed the National Register of Secured Credit, was Vice President of the Forensic Fund of Río Negro, and President of the SanCor co-operative's insurance division. He was elected Councilman in General Roca in 1989, and mayor of the city in 1991; he was re-elected in 1995 and served in the post until 1999. He became a provincial deputy that year and was president of the Río Negro chapter of the UCR-led Alliance (in power nationally between 1999 and 2001).

Saiz was elected governor of the province in 2003, defeating Carlos Soria. He became a leading supporter within UCR ranks of the left-wing Peronist President Néstor Kirchner, and helped form the "K Radicals" caucus (UCR supporters of Kirchner).

Saiz ran for re-election against Justicialist Party politician Miguel Ángel Pichetto in the 2007 gubernatorial race. President Kirchner considered backing Saiz at the expense of his own party, though ultimately opted to play no role in the provincial election. Saiz won re-election over Pichetto by around 5% with the support of various leftist parties, and his membership in the UCR was subsequently suspended by the party committee. Eventually in 2011, he withdrew supporting Cristina Kirchner.

References

External links
Río Negro Province 

1949 births
2019 deaths
People from Montevideo
Uruguayan emigrants to Argentina
National University of Córdoba alumni
Radical Civic Union politicians
Mayors of General Roca, Río Negro
Governors of Río Negro Province